A lunar deity or moon deity  is a deity who represents the Moon, or an aspect of it. These deities can have a variety of functions and traditions depending upon the culture, but they are often related. Lunar deities and Moon worship can be found throughout most of recorded history in various forms.

Moon in religion and mythology
Many cultures have implicitly linked the 29.5-day lunar cycle to women's menstrual cycles, as evident in the shared linguistic roots of "menstruation" and "moon" words in multiple language families. This identification was not universal, as demonstrated by the fact that not all moon deities are female. Still, many well-known mythologies feature moon goddesses, including the Greek goddess Selene, the Roman goddess Luna, and the Chinese goddess Chang'e. Several goddesses including Artemis, Hecate, and Isis did not originally have lunar aspects, and only acquired them late in antiquity due to syncretism with the de facto Greco-Roman lunar deity Selene/Luna. In traditions with male gods, there is little evidence of such syncretism.

Male lunar gods are also common, such as Sin of the Mesopotamians, Mani of the Germanic tribes, Tsukuyomi of the Japanese, Igaluk/Alignak of the Inuit, and the Hindu god Chandra. The original Proto-Indo-European lunar deity, *Meh₁not appears to have been male, with many possible derivatives including the Homeric figure of Menelaus. Cultures with male moon gods often feature sun goddesses. An exception is Hinduism, featuring both male and female aspects of the solar divine. The ancient Egyptians had several moon gods including Khonsu and Thoth, although Thoth is a considerably more complex deity. Set represented the moon in the Egyptian Calendar of Lucky and Unlucky Days.

Many cultures are oriented chronologically by the Moon, as opposed to the Sun. The Hindu calendar maintains the integrity of the lunar month and the moon god Chandra has religious significance during many Hindu festivals (e.g. Karwa Chauth, Sankashti Chaturthi, and during eclipses). The ancient Germanic tribes were also known to have a lunar calendar.

The Moon features prominently in art and literature, often with a purported influence on human affairs.

See also
Astrotheology
Nature worship
Solar deity
List of solar deities
List of lunar deities

References

 
 
 
Comparative mythology
Mythological archetypes